Baddeck (Guneden) Aerodrome  is a registered aerodrome located  north of Baddeck, Nova Scotia, Canada.

While the surrounding scenery is quite beautiful, in strong wind conditions there can be significant turbulence for light aircraft on approach to runway 22, due to the aerodrome's location in the foothills overlooking Baddeck. The hilly location is why runway 04 uses non-standard right hand circuits.

References

Registered aerodromes in Nova Scotia
Transport in Victoria County, Nova Scotia
Buildings and structures in Victoria County, Nova Scotia